Hanea is a monotypic genus of South Pacific araneomorph spiders in the family Cyatholipidae containing the single species, Hanea paturau. It was first described by Raymond Robert Forster in 1988, and has only been found in New Zealand.

References

Cyatholipidae
Monotypic Araneomorphae genera
Taxa named by Raymond Robert Forster